Quinnesec is an unincorporated community in Dickinson County in the U.S. state of Michigan. It is a census-designated place (CDP) for statistical purposes and has no legally recognized status as a municipality. The population was 1,191 at the 2010 census. It is part of the Iron Mountain, MI–WI Micropolitan Statistical Area.

Quinnesec is in Breitung Charter Township on the Menominee River, which forms the boundary with Wisconsin. The ZIP code is 49876.

Geography

Name
Quinnesec is a corruption of "Bekuenesec" (from the Ojibwe bekweneseg, meaning "smoky"), named after the Big and Little Quinnesec Falls, which were at one time known as Big and Little Bekuenesec Falls.

Demographics

As of the census of 2000, there were 1,187 people, 436 households, and 356 families residing in the CDP. The racial makeup of the CDP was 98.40% White, 0.51% Native American, 0.34% Asian, and 0.76% from two or more races. Hispanic or Latino of any race were 0.17% of the population.

There were 436 households, out of which 38.3% had children under the age of 18 living with them, 70.6% were married couples living together, 6.4% had a female householder with no husband present, and 18.3% were non-families. 14.4% of all households were made up of individuals, and 7.6% had someone living alone who was 65 years of age or older.  The average household size was 2.71 and the average family size was 2.98.

In the CDP, the population was spread out, with 26.8% under the age of 18, 6.0% from 18 to 24, 31.0% from 25 to 44, 26.3% from 45 to 64, and 9.9% who were 65 years of age or older.  The median age was 38 years. For every 100 females, there were 102.6 males.  For every 100 females age 18 and over, there were 101.6 males.

The median income for a household in the CDP was $41,957, and the median income for a family was $44,291. Males had a median income of $32,931 versus $30,515 for females. The per capita income for the CDP was $17,139.  About 1.9% of families and 2.7% of the population were below the poverty line, including none of those under age 18 and 5.0% of those age 65 or over.

Notable people
Edward B. McKenna (1883–1942), former Democratic member of the Michigan Senate (1933–1934).

References

Unincorporated communities in Dickinson County, Michigan
Census-designated places in Michigan
Iron Mountain micropolitan area
Unincorporated communities in Michigan
Census-designated places in Dickinson County, Michigan